Washington Township is one of twelve townships in Adams County, Iowa, USA.  At the 2010 census, its population was 135.

Geography
According to the USGS (United States Geological Survey), it contains four cemeteries: Forest Hill, Homan, Mount Etna and Old Mount Etna.

References

External links
 US-Counties.com
 City-Data.com

Townships in Adams County, Iowa
Townships in Iowa